Nocturnal Lights... They Scatter is the fifth studio album by South Korean pianist Yiruma.

Track listing

References

 http://www.alexdang.com/2010/08/yiruma-nocturnal-lights-they-scatter.html

2004 albums
Yiruma albums